Kireka is the name of a township in Central Uganda. It is one of the six townships or Wards that constitute Kira Municipality in Wakiso District. The other five Wards in Kira Municipality are Bweyogerere Ward, Kimwaanyi Ward, Kira Ward, Kirinnya Ward and Kyaliwajjala Ward.

Location
The township is bordered by Kyaliwajjala to the north, Bweyogerere to the east, Kirinnya to the south, Banda  to the west, Kyambogo and Naalya to the northwest. The coordinates of the township are:00 20 48N, 32 39 00E (Latitude:0.346667; Longitude:32.650000).

Overview

Kireka is a busy township that grew out of a shopping center in the 1950s and 1960s. It is predominantly a working class city suburb with shops, restaurants, Internet cafes, banks, several gas stations and a post office. There is a large central market where farmers bring their produce to sell to the city folk.

Population

During the 2002 national census, Kireka, at about 54,000 people, comprised 38.4% of the population of Kira Municipality. In 2011, the Uganda Bureau of Statistics (UBOS), estimated the population of Kira Municipality of which Kireka is a part, at 179,800. Therefore, it is estimated that in 2011, the population of Kireka Township was approximately 68,000.

Points of interest
The neighborhood of Kireka contains the following points of interest:

 The Kireka-Namugongo Road - The road to the Uganda Martyrs' Basilica at Namugongo leaves the Kampala-Jinja Highway at Kireka
 A branch of Barclays Bank
 A branch of Centenary Bank
 A branch of Crane Bank
 A branch of Stanbic Bank
 A palace of Kabaka Ronald Muwenda Mutebi II; the Kireka Palace
 Mandela National Stadium, the largest sports stadium in Uganda, with a maximum capacity of 45,000, lies in the neighboring neighborhood of Bweyogerere 
 Kireka Central Market
 Kireka Seventh Day Adventist Church - A place of worship affiliated with the Seventh-day Adventist Church
 Club Zinc - A nightclub dating back to the 1970s

See also

References

External links
 About Kireka
 Night Life in Kireka

Kira Town
Populated places in Central Region, Uganda
Cities in the Great Rift Valley
Populated places on Lake Victoria